Pietro Bocca (died 1487) was a Roman Catholic prelate who served as Bishop of Bagnoregio (1475–1487).

Biography
On 6 November 1475, Pietro Bocca was appointed during the papacy of Pope Sixtus IV as Bishop of Bagnoregio. He served as Bishop of Bagnoregio until his death in 1487 (although his death date is not certain with other records stating 1483).

See also 
Catholic Church in Italy

References

External links and additional sources
 (for Chronology of Bishops) 
 (for Chronology of Bishops) 

15th-century Italian Roman Catholic bishops
1487 deaths
Bishops appointed by Pope Sixtus IV